Fields of the Nephilim are an English gothic rock band formed in Stevenage, Hertfordshire, in 1984. The band's name refers to a Biblical race of angel-human hybrids known as the Nephilim.

Career

Early years (1984–1991) 
Fields of the Nephilim's initial sound incorporated elements of hard rock, gothic rock, heavy metal and psychedelic rock, and comprised a bass- and guitar-driven sound underpinned by McCoy's growled vocals. Lyrically, the band incorporated themes concerning magic (specifically chaos magic), the Cthulhu Mythos, the Sumerian religion, and the works of Aleister Crowley.
The band had a "dust and death" image, associated with characters from Sergio Leone's Spaghetti Westerns and often wore cowboy dusters with a weather-beaten look during photoshoots. This weather-beaten look was attained by dusting themselves down with, by their own admission, Mother's Pride flour. This also proved problematic for the band as in May 1988, Nottinghamshire Police detained the band whilst a suspect substance was tested for drugs. This was later determined to be nothing but flour from the stage set.

Their debut EP, Burning the Fields, was released in 1985 by Situation Two records (an imprint of Beggars Banquet Records). The band "upgraded" to Beggars Banquet in 1986 to release "Power" and "Preacher Man", and their first album, Dawnrazor which topped the Indie chart in 1987. The next release, "Blue Water", was the first Fields of the Nephilim single to reach the UK Singles Chart (number 75). It was followed by "Moonchild", lead single from the second LP The Nephilim which reached number 28 in the UK chart.

Psychonaut was released in May 1989 and peaked at number 35; the ten-minute track indicated a slight shift for the band toward a more experimental and intense sound. This single/EP was a precursor for the polished and highly produced Elizium album (1990). Produced by Pink Floyd / David Gilmour engineer Andy Jackson (taking over from previous band producer Bill Buchanan), the album was preceded by the single "For Her Light", which clipped the British Top 40 in its first week of release. A remixed version of "Sumerland (Dreamed)" (this version is on the CD single only and differed from the 7" vinyl format of the same release), released in November 1990, peaked at number 37.

In 1991, the band played their final gigs, a two-day 'Festival of Fire' in London. The final releases of this era are the live CD Earth Inferno and video Visionary Heads, followed by the compilation Revelations.

Departure of McCoy and hiatus (1991–1998) 
Frontman McCoy left the band in 1991. The remaining members, together with singer Andy Delaney, chose not to continue with the "Fields of the Nephilim" name and recorded instead under the name Rubicon. The band released two albums before disbanding: What Starts, Ends in 1992 and Room 101 in 1995.

Meanwhile, Carl McCoy formed a new project called Nefilim in 1991 after the disbanding of Fields of the Nephilim.

The band played some gigs in 1993, showcasing some new material. According to McCoy, the release of their debut album, Zoon, was delayed for several years due to disagreements with the record label. Zoon was eventually released in 1996 and featured a distinctly heavier sound than McCoy's previous works.

Reunion and new album (1998–2002) 
On 15 August 1998, McCoy and original bassist Tony Pettitt held a press conference at the Zillo Festival in Germany, announcing their future plans to collaborate under two separate monikers, Fields of the Nephilim (along with the Wright brothers) and The Nefilim (an altered spelling of McCoy's solo project).

According to different original band members, the band was rehearsing and writing the next Fields of the Nephilim album (with the exception of Yates). However, the awaited reunion of the original band line-up never happened.

In May 2000, McCoy released "One More Nightmare (Trees Come Down)", the first Fields of the Nephilim single with their new label, Jungle Records. It contained newly worked versions of "Trees Come Down" and "Darkcell," both originally released on the Burning the Fields EP in 1984. Between June and August 2000, the band made four live appearances at European festivals; Woodstage, Eurorock, Roskilde and M'era Luna music festivals.

In 2002, Jungle Records and Metropolis Records released the first Fields of the Nephilim studio album since Elizium, entitled Fallen. The release was not authorised by the band, and consists of unfinished recordings from 1997–2001, the 2000 reworkings of "Trees Come Down" and "Darkcell", and a previously unreleased demo by The Nefilim. The release was disowned by the band for many years, and only one song from it, "From The Fire," has been performed live.

Mourning Sun and Ceromonies (2005–2008) 
Fifteen years after Elizium, McCoy released Mourning Sun, his fourth full-length studio album under the name Fields of the Nephilim. The album had seven original songs, with a cover version of Zager and Evans's "In the Year 2525" included as a bonus track on the first 5,000 copies.

In interviews following the release of the album Mourning Sun, McCoy mentions collaborating with ghost musicians but only John "Capachino" Carter is officially credited on the album.

In 2006, some European venues announced a tour was to take place, although this was never officially confirmed. In spite of high ticket sales, none of the gigs occurred. Through the band's official website, McCoy emphasised that he had at not confirmed these dates with promoters or venues, and reiterated that people should not buy tickets for such events until official announcements through the band's website that such live performances were to go ahead.

In May 2007, McCoy performed as Fields of the Nephilim for the first time in seven years, at the London Astoria. According to the band's website, the event was filmed by video director Richard Stanley, who had directed videos for the original band's singles: however, due to quality issues with the audio recording & filming it was abandoned.

Ceromonies was the culmination of a two night event sponsored by Metal Hammer magazine in which the band played material spanning the band's career. Performed at London's O2 Shepherds Bush Empire the band performed to sell-out crowds. The 'Ceromonies' line-up for this event that featured on the live album and DVD was McCoy, Carter, King, Edwards and Newell. Highlights of this period included the band's biggest ever headline show to date at the 2008 M'era Luna Festival, where the 'Ceromonies' line-up performed in front of over 23,000 people. The rapturous encore from this show, "Last Exit for the Lost", was also included on Ceromonies.

In June 2008, a DVD entitled Live in Düsseldorf 1991 was released. Sacred Symphony released the DVD and double CD box set as well as a double LP vinyl version of Ceromonies (Ad Mortem Ad Vitam) on 16 April 2012, consisting of recordings and footage from the two concerts. The vinyl version does not come with the live DVD. It was also released as a Collectible box set coming in a wooden box with the Ceromonies logo and title branded on the wooden lid.

Since 2008, McCoy and band have performed every year under the name Fields of the Nephilim at venues and festivals across Europe.

Present day 
On 1 July 2014, Carl McCoy announced that the band was back in the studio "...recording and compiling the most important elements created and gathered." In December 2014, the band debuted two new songs live onstage, "Earthbound" and "Prophecy". "Prophecy" was released as a single on the Sacred Symphony label available only as download on iTunes on 17 March 2016.
It was promoted as a band single, but the track did not feature Pettitt.
News reports said that a release on both CD and vinyl, containing exclusive artwork and bonus material would follow, though this did not happen.

Tom Edwards died in 2017 from heart failure, whilst touring in the US with Adam Ant.

As of 2022, the band continues to perform live shows.

Legacy 
In 2001, Nod and Paul Wright formed a new band, Last Rites. They released two full-length albums: Guided by Light (2001) and The Many Forms (2005).

Pettitt performed in The Eden House and NFD.

Cian Houchin has performed and recorded albums as the frontman for Saints of Eden.

Fields of the Nephilim inspired a number of other bands, including Watain and Katatonia.

Parody 
From 1988, during the band's period of mainstream attention following the release of Dawnrazor and Psychonaut, the music newspaper Melody Maker published various spoof articles about the band. This culminated in a regular feature called The Nod Corner, which purported to be written by Nephilim drummer Nod Wright and which took a satirical view on the band's baleful and dramatic image, usually portraying McCoy as a prima donna who exploited and bullied Nod. Wright appeared to take the spoof graciously.

Members

Current lineup 
 Carl McCoy – vocals (1984–present)
 Gavin King – guitar (2007–present)
 Lee Newell – drums (2007–present)
 Tony Pettit – bass (1984–1991, 1998–2000, 2013–present)
 Adam Paul Leach – guitar (2018–present)

Former members 
 Gary Wisker – saxophone (1984–1985)
 Paul Wright – guitar (1984–1991, 1998–2000)
 'Nod' Alexander Wright – drums (1985–1991, 1998–2000)
 Peter Yates – guitar (1985–1991)
 John 'Capachino' Carter – bass (drums/guitars/keys/vocals – studio) (2000–2009)
 Tom Edwards [Deceased] – guitar (2008–2016)

Discography 

Dawnrazor (1987)
The Nephilim (1988)
Elizium (1990)
Fallen (2002)
Mourning Sun (2005)

References

External links 

 Fields of the Nephilim official website
 

English gothic rock groups
Musical groups established in 1984
Metropolis Records artists
Situation Two artists
Beggars Banquet Records artists
Musical groups from Hertfordshire